The Cargo Airline Association is a trade association among the cargo airline air carriers industry.

Member airlines 
 ABX Air
 Air Transport International
 Air Transport Services Group
 Astar Air Cargo
 Atlas Air
 Capital Cargo International Airlines
 FedEx Express
 First Air
 Kalitta Air
 UPS Airlines

External links

Airline trade associations
Organizations with year of establishment missing